Burdette is an unincorporated community in Lee Township, Franklin County, Iowa, United States.

History
Burdette's population was 20 in 1925.

References

Unincorporated communities in Franklin County, Iowa
Unincorporated communities in Iowa